Brian Reid Bollinger (born November 21, 1968) is a former American football offensive guard who played three seasons with the San Francisco 49ers of the National Football League (NFL). He was drafted by the San Francisco 49ers in the third round of the 1992 NFL Draft. Bollinger played college football at the University of North Carolina and attended Melbourne High School in Melbourne, Florida. He was a member of the San Francisco 49ers team that won Super Bowl XXIX.

References

External links
Just Sports Stats
Fanbase profile

Living people
1968 births
Players of American football from Florida
American football offensive guards
North Carolina Tar Heels football players
San Francisco 49ers players
People from Indialantic, Florida
Melbourne High School alumni